Sir Samuel Hayes, 1st Baronet (1737–1807) of Drumboe Castle, County Donegal was a Baronet in the Baronetage of Ireland and Member of Parliament for Augher in the Irish House of Commons between 1783 and 1790.

Family
Hayes’s father Charles Hayes of Bridgwater, Somerset, who married Deborah Holditch of Totnes, Devon, was vice-consul in Lisbon.

Samuel worked as a London surgeon and then married Mary Basil, only heiress of valuable estate of Drumboe in the north of Ireland. She was daughter of William Basil (previously Ball) of Wilton Park, Buckinghamshire and Drumboe Castle. The children from this marriage included:
Sir Samuel Hayes, 2nd Baronet 
Mary Hayes, married Revd. Andrew Thomas Hamilton, brother of Sir John Hamilton, 1st Baronet, of Woodbrook
Frances Hayes, married John Boyd of Ballymacool, County Donegal

Career

He represented Augher in the Irish House of Commons between 1783 and 1790. He was Governor of County Donegal between 1781 and 1807.

References

1737 births
1807 deaths
Baronets in the Baronetage of Ireland
Irish MPs 1783–1790
Members of the Parliament of Ireland (pre-1801) for County Tyrone constituencies